William Robertson (24 March 1866 – 9 December 1926) was a Scottish footballer who played as a right winger.

Career
Robertson played club football for Dumbarton, featuring on the losing side in the 1887 Scottish Cup Final; he was no longer a regular by the 1890s due to work commitments and had no involvement with their success in the first two seasons of the Scottish Football League. 

He played twice for Scotland in 1887 (wins over England and Wales, in which he scored).

Personal life
Born in Dumbarton, Robertson attended Blairlodge School (Polmont) and the University of Glasgow, and was a lawyer by profession. He was active in several sports, including rugby union (which he played rather than football in his teenage years), tennis and golf.

Honours
Dumbarton
 Scottish Cup: Runners Up 1886–87
 2 caps for Scotland in 1887, scoring one goal;
 1 representative cap for Dumbartonshire in 1886, scoring 2 goals
 1 international trial match for Scotland in 1887.

References

External links
 William Robertson [I] (The Sons Archive) 
 William Robertson [II] (The Sons Archive) 

1866 births
1926 deaths
Scottish footballers
Scotland international footballers
Scottish Football League players
Dumbarton F.C. players
Association football outside forwards
Sportspeople from Dumbarton
Footballers from West Dunbartonshire